Sreerupa Mitra Chaudhury, popularly known as Nirbhaya Didi, is an Indian politician and a member of Bharatiya Janata Party from West Bengal, India. She is also a social worker, women's rights activist and former journalist.

Personal life
Sreerupa Mitra Chaudhury hails from South Baluchar Battla in Malda district of West Bengal. She is a Post Graduate and did her Masters of Arts from North Bengal University in 1987. She is married to R. K. Mitra.

Career
In 2004 she took part in the launching of the National Legal Literacy Mission. As of 2008 she served as national advisor of the National Legal Services Authority of the Ministry of Law and Justice. As of 2010 she was the president of the NGO Sudinalay.

Known as Nirbhaya Didi in Kolkata, she was involved with the process of rehabilitation of rape victims and providing toilets to women. She chaired the special task force on rape, trafficking and violence against women set up by the Prime Minister Manmohan Singh after the 2012 Delhi gang rape. She resigned from this post in December 2013, amidst speculations that she could have run for parliament from the Malda seat as an All India Trinamool Congress candidate.

Chaudhury was named as the candidate of the All India Trinamool Congress in the South Delhi Lok Sabha seat in the 2014 general election. In 2019, Lok Sabha election, she contested from Maldaha Dakshin seat with a Bharatiya Janata Party ticket. But lost to Abu Hasem Khan Choudhury by a small margin.

In the 2021 West Bengal Legislative Assembly election, Chaudhury contested as a Bharatiya Janata Party candidate from English Bazar and won the seat by defeating her nearest rival from TMC.

References

1960s births
Living people
Bengali Hindus
21st-century Bengalis
Bengali activists
Candidates in the 2014 Indian general election
Candidates in the 2019 Indian general election
Bharatiya Janata Party politicians from West Bengal
People from Malda district
People from English Bazar
Trinamool Congress politicians from West Bengal
West Bengal MLAs 2021–2026
Activists from West Bengal
Indian activists
Indian women activists
Indian social workers
Indian feminists
Indian women's rights activists
Indian journalists
Indian women journalists
20th-century Indian journalists
21st-century Indian journalists
University of North Bengal alumni